The coat of arms of Malawi is based on the earlier heraldic arms of Nyasaland. It is supported by a lion and a leopard, above a scroll reading "Unity and Freedom". A rising sun in a black field, like in the lower field in the shield, is also present in the flag of Malawi.

Blazon

The Coat of Arms of Malawi are described as follows:

Gallery

References

Malawi
National symbols of Malawi
Malawi
Malawi
Malawi
Malawi
Malawi
Malawi
Malawi